Wiener is a German language monthly men's magazine published in Vienna, Austria. It has been in circulation since 1979

History and profile
Wiener was established in 1979. Markus Peichl and Michael Hopp were the founders of the magazine. The founding art director of the magazine was Lo Breier. The first issue was published in November 1979. 

Initially Wiener carried articles on Vienna and its cultural scene. Later it changed its scope and became a men's fashion and lifestyle magazine. The magazine which is published monthly 11 times per year features interviews and articles about celebrities and trends. Its owner is Styria Multi Media company. The publisher is Wiener Verlags led by Peter Mosser.

Gerd Leitgeb was the editor of Wiener. Peter Moser served as the editor-in-chief of the magazine until July 2006 when Alexander Macheck succeeded him in the post. As of 2015 its editor-in-chief was Wolfgang Wieser.

Circulation
The 1985 circulation of Wiener was 118,000 copies. Its circulation was 45,000 copies in 2007 and 47,500 copies in 2010. The magazine had a circulation of 43,820 copies between January and June 2014.

Incidents
Kurt Waldheim sued both Wiener and Stern in 1987 for publishing articles about his Nazi activities in Yugoslavia. In the September 2010 issue of Wiener, nude photos of ballerina Karina Sarkissova were published. Following the publication Sarkissova was fired from the ballet company of the Vienna State Opera in October 2010.

See also
 List of magazines in Austria

References

External links
 Official website

1979 establishments in Austria
Celebrity magazines
German-language magazines
Lifestyle magazines
Magazines established in 1979
Magazines published in Vienna
Men's fashion magazines
Monthly magazines published in Austria